Cousins is a surname, originating from Normandy. Cousins derived from the Old French word "cusin" (relative). 

Notable people with the surname include:

 Alan William James Cousins (1903–2001), South African astronomer
 Ben Cousins (born 1978), former Australian rules footballer
 Christian and Joseph Cousins
Christopher Cousins, American actor (born 1960)
 Dave Cousins , American archer
 Dave Cousins , leader of the UK band Strawbs
 David Cousins , British
 DeMarcus Cousins (born 1990), American basketball player
 Derryl Cousins , American baseball umpire
 Frank Cousins (British politician)
 Frank Cousins (American politician)
 Henry Cousins (1827–1888), American politician and lawyer
 Isaiah Cousins (born 1994), American basketball player in the Israeli Basketball Premier League
 Jake Cousins (born 1994), American baseball player
 James Cousins
 Jim Cousins , English
 Kirk Cousins (born 1988), American football player
 Kristina Cousins
Lethia Cousins Fleming (1876–1963), American suffragist, teacher, civil rights activist and politician.
 L. S. Cousins
 Lothan Cousins, Jamaican politician
 Lucy Cousins
 Marshall Cousins (1869–1939), American politician, businessman, and historian
 Mark Cousins (footballer)
 Nick Cousins (born 1993), Canadian ice hockey player
 Norman Cousins (1915–1990), American writer and peace activist
 Dr. Oliver Cousins , fictional character
 Richard Cousins (1959–2017), British businessman, chief executive of the Compass Group
 Robin Cousins (born 1957), British figure skater
 Samuel Cousins
 Scott Cousins (born 1985), American baseball player
 Steven Cousins , British
 Tina Cousins , English
 Tom Cousins

See also 
 Cousin (disambiguation)
William Cousins (disambiguation)

References 

English-language surnames
Norman-language surnames